Marlise is a given name. Notable people with the name include:

Marlise Keith (born 1972), South African artist 
Marlise Simons, Dutch-born American journalist
Marlise Wendels (1923–2012), German operatic soprano 

Feminine given names